Hulsman is a surname. Notable people with the surname include:

 (1931–2018), Dutch actor and television actor
 Cornelis Hulsman (born 1955), Dutch sociologist
 Johann Hulsman (1610–1652), German Baroque painter
 John Hulsman (born 1967), American academic and writer
 Louk Hulsman (1923–2009), Dutch legal scientist and criminologist

See also
 Hulsmans